was a Japanese golfer. He turned pro at the age of 16 and continued with 12 post-war wins. Hayashi was considered one of the big top four Japanese golfers along with Isao Aoki, Masashi Ozaki and Akiko Fukushima.

He died at the age of 89 on 2 January 2012.

Professional wins
this list is probably incomplete
1948 Kanto Pro Championship
1949 Japan PGA Championship
1950 Japan Open, Japan PGA Championship
1952 Yomiuri Pro
1953 Kanto Pro Championship
1954 Japan Open
1955 Kanto Open, Yomiuri Pro
1956 Japan PGA Championship
1960 Kanto Open
1961 Japan PGA Championship

Team appearances
Canada Cup (representing Japan): 1956

References

Further reading

Japanese male golfers
People from Abiko, Chiba
Sportspeople from Chiba Prefecture
1922 births
2012 deaths